Arnaldo Bristol Sabater (born 11 September 1945) is a Puerto Rican hurdler. He competed in the 110 metres hurdles at the 1964, 1968, 1972 and the 1976 Summer Olympics. He won a bronze medal in the 110 metres hurdles at the 1975 Pan American Games and a silver in the same event at the 1971 Pan American Games.

Bristol won the 1966 Drake Relays high hurdle race while representing Texas Southern in 13.6.

References

External links
 

1945 births
Living people
Athletes (track and field) at the 1964 Summer Olympics
Athletes (track and field) at the 1968 Summer Olympics
Athletes (track and field) at the 1972 Summer Olympics
Athletes (track and field) at the 1976 Summer Olympics
Puerto Rican male hurdlers
Olympic track and field athletes of Puerto Rico
Pan American Games silver medalists for Puerto Rico
Pan American Games bronze medalists for Puerto Rico
Pan American Games medalists in athletics (track and field)
People from Guayama, Puerto Rico
Athletes (track and field) at the 1971 Pan American Games
Athletes (track and field) at the 1975 Pan American Games
Medalists at the 1971 Pan American Games
Medalists at the 1975 Pan American Games
Central American and Caribbean Games medalists in athletics